Khanqah Sirajia , is a Union Council of Mianwali District in the Punjab province of Pakistan. Ding Khola is a village in this union council, inhabited mostly by Talokar caste .Bharon is also wellknown tribe of this area. It is an administrative subdivision of Piplan Tehsil.

References

Populated places in Mianwali District
Union councils of Mianwali District